James McQueen McIntosh (1828 – March 7, 1862) was a career American soldier who served as a brigadier general in the Confederate Army during the Civil War. Noted as an aggressive and popular leader of cavalry, he was killed in action at the Battle of Pea Ridge.

Birth and early years
McIntosh was born at Fort Brooke (at today's Tampa), Florida Territory, while his Georgia-born father was on active duty in the U.S. Army. His younger brother was future Union general John Baillie McIntosh. They were descended from a Revolutionary War commander, and their great-great uncle was General Lachlan McIntosh. Their father, a colonel, was killed in action during the Battle of Molino del Rey.

Military career
James McIntosh received an appointment to the United States Military Academy in West Point, New York, but proved to be a poor student and graduated last in the Class of 1849. He first served in the infantry as a second lieutenant before transferring to the cavalry and serving on the Western frontier. He was stationed at Fort Smith in Arkansas when several Southern states, including his native Florida, began seceding in early 1861.

With the outbreak of the Civil War, McIntosh resigned his commission and joined the Confederate cause as colonel of the 2nd Arkansas Mounted Rifles. He saw combat action in the August 1861 Battle of Wilson's Creek. Although he was courageous and daring, McIntosh was also impulsive and reckless, preferring to lead his men from the front instead of concentrating on the duties of a brigade commander.

In the late autumn, Confederate troops undertook a campaign to subdue the Native American Union sympathizers in Indian Territory and consolidate control. Colonel Douglas H. Cooper, commanding the Indian Department, planned a coordinated attack with McIntosh on the enemy camp at Chustenahlah. McIntosh left Fort Gibson on December 22, with 1,380 men. On Christmas Day, he learned that Cooper’s force was delayed, but he decided to attack the next day, despite being outnumbered. McIntosh assaulted the camp at noon on the 26th, utterly routing Chief Opothleyahola’s band of Creeks and Seminoles.

As a result of his decisive victory, McIntosh received a promotion to brigadier general in January 1862.

Death and burial
At the Battle of Pea Ridge, he commanded a brigade in the division of Ben McCulloch, who was killed by Union infantry fire. Shortly after assuming division command, McIntosh was leading an advance when he was struck and killed by a bullet, less than fifteen minutes after McCulloch's death.

He is buried in the Fort Smith National Cemetery. A memorial to Unknown Confederate Dead, made of marble, commemorates McIntosh, as well as Brigadier General Alexander E. Steen, a Missourian who was killed at the Battle of Prairie Grove.

See also

List of American Civil War generals (Confederate)

Notes

References
 Eicher, John H., and David J. Eicher, Civil War High Commands. Stanford: Stanford University Press, 2001. .
 Sifakis, Stewart. Who Was Who in the Civil War. New York: Facts On File, 1988. .
 Warner, Ezra J. Generals in Gray: Lives of the Confederate Commanders. Baton Rouge: Louisiana State University Press, 1959. .
National Park Service biography of McIntosh
National Park Service battle summary: Chustenahlah

External links
West Point "last in their class" website
Short biography of McIntosh

Confederate States Army generals
People of Florida in the American Civil War
People of Arkansas in the American Civil War
People from Tampa, Florida
United States Military Academy alumni
United States Army officers
Confederate States of America military personnel killed in the American Civil War
1828 births
1862 deaths
Lawrenceville School alumni
Burials at Fort Smith National Cemetery